Copelatinae is a subfamily of diving beetles, in the family Dytiscidae.  The subfamily contains seven genera:
Agaporomorphus, Aglymbus, Copelatus, Exocelina, Lacconectus, Liopterus, and Madaglymbus. Of these, the largest is Copelatus, which has about 470 described species found worldwide, but most diverse in tropical South America, Africa and South-East Asia.

References

Beetle subfamilies
Dytiscidae